Wentzville Assembly is a General Motors auto and truck assembly facility in Wentzville, Missouri, opened in 1983. Located at 1500 East Route A in Wentzville, 
the 3.7 million square foot plant sits on 569 acres approximately 40 miles west of St. Louis, just off of I-70.   

With a similar floor plan to its contemporaries, Michigan's Orion Assembly and Hamtramck plants, the facility includes vehicle assembly as well as body stamping facilities. Originally manufacturing full-size Buick, Oldsmobile and Pontiac sedans, the plant assumed operations of the previous St. Louis Truck Assembly which had been in operation since 1920. 

In 1996, production shifted from manufacturing unibody, front-drive passenger cars to rear-drive, body on frame trucks, GM's full-size Chevrolet Express and GMC Savana cargo vans on the GMT600 platform,  previously manufactured at Lordstown Assembly (Ohio) and Flint Assembly (Michigan).  The changeover involved completely gutting and revamping the plant to provide robotic body assembly. 

The GMT600 vans received a significant revision for the 2003 model year, known internally as the GMT610,  which included a new front end, new powertrains ("LS" engines), left hand side cargo doors, and AWD models. In 2014, GM replaced the lighter 1500-series vans with the Chevrolet City Express built by Nissan in Mexico, retaining manufacture of the commercial-grade models in Wentzville. 

Also in 2014, Wentzville began manufacturing the Chevrolet Colorado and GMC Canyon, whose predecessors had been manuactured at the shuttered Shreveport Assembly factory in Louisiana.  

Wentzville has received numerous quality awards over the years for both the mid size truck and full size van models.

Current Vehicles
Chevrolet Colorado 2014–present
GMC Canyon 2014–present 
Chevrolet Express 2500, 3500 1996–present
GMC Savana 2500, 3500 1996–present

Past Vehicles
Buick Electra 1985-1990
Buick Park Avenue 1991-1994
Pontiac Bonneville 1989-1993
Oldsmobile 88 1986-1993
Oldsmobile 98 1985-1989
Oldsmobile Touring Sedan 1987-1989
Chevrolet Express 1500 1996-2013
GMC Savana 1500 1996-2013

References

General Motors factories
Motor vehicle assembly plants in Missouri
1983 establishments in Missouri
Buildings and structures in St. Charles County, Missouri